U Craiova 1948 Club Sportiv, commonly known as Universitatea Craiova, CS U Craiova, or simply U Craiova, is a Romanian professional football team based in Craiova, Dolj County, which competes in the Liga I, the top tier of the Romanian league system.

Initially founded in 1948 as the football section of the CSU Craiova sports club, it was part of it until 1991, when its berth in the league championship was taken by FC U Craiova following privatisation. Between 1948 and 1991, Universitatea had won four national titles and five national cups. In the next two decades however, FC U was reorganised several times and disaffiliated, which led to it being retroactively deemed an unofficial successor to the old entity. In 2013, the sports club refounded its football department, which asserted the history and trophies of the original Universitatea Craiova. They have since been backed up by several court orders and the Liga Profesionistă de Fotbal, but the record remains subject of legal dispute with the also reestablished FC U team and uncertainty persists. In 2018, "the White and Blues" won the Cupa României, representing their first trophy following refoundation, and in 2021 won their first Supercupa României.

On the European stage, Universitatea Craiova's best performances are reaching the semi-finals of the 1982–83 UEFA Cup and the quarter-finals of the 1981–82 European Cup. They were the first Romanian team to reach the semi-finals of a UEFA tournament and remain the only one to have knocked out at least one club from each of five strongest countries in European football—England, France, Germany, Italy and Spain. "The Students" play their home matches at the Stadionul Ion Oblemenco, which has a capacity of 30,929. They hold several rivalries, the most notable being the one with Dinamo București.

History

Early years of football in Craiova (1921–1958)

The football history in the city of Craiova began in 1921, when the first teams were founded: Craiovan Craiova and Rovine Grivița Craiova. In 1940, the two sides merged in what resulted to be one of the most successful Romanian clubs of the Interwar period, FC Craiova, which was also the first team of the city that won the Romanian football championship. However, the 1942–43 title is not recognized officially by FRF and LPF due to the unofficial character of the competition in that season.

Immediately after the foundation of the first university education institution – the Institute of Machines and Electric Devices – a group of teachers and students founded CSU Craiova in 1948, a sports club with athletics, volleyball, handball, table tennis, chess and football sections.

Under the coordination of the Ministry of Public Education and of the National Union of Students in Romania, the football team UNSR Craiova (Uniunea Națională a Studenților din România) was formed and enrolled in the county championship. The first official match was held at Filiași on 5 September 1948, "the Students" being defeated 6–3. The white-blue shirt was dressed for the first time by the following line-up: Dumitrescu – Rădulescu, Mihăilă I, Carli – Ozon, Mihăilă II – Sabin, Ilie, Bădescu, Tudor, Serghi, under the command of head coach N. Polojinski.

In 1950 the football section changed its name from UNSR Craiova to CSU Craiova, the same name as the parent club. In 1951, CSU Craiova defeated with 6–0 the local rival, Constructorul Craiova, in what was going to be the first official match played in Cupa României. In 1953 the club changed its name again, this time in Știința Craiova, and one year later at the Divizia B promotion play-off, hosted in Arad, Știința, coached by Nicolae Oțeleanu, qualified for the 1955 season, thus promoting for the first time in its history at the level of the second echelon. The club relegated back to Divizia C after only one season and remained at that level until 1958.

Universitatea, a rising team (1958–1970)

In 1958 Știința promoted for the second time in the second league after a fight on the knife edge in the 3rd series of the Divizia C against Unirea Râmnicu Vâlcea, at the end of the season both teams finished with 34 points, but with the advantage of direct matches for the white and blue team. In the first season after promotion, Craiova ended only on 13th place, out of 14, but progresses have been made in the next seasons: 1959–60 – 10th, 1960–61 – 2nd, but far away from the 1st place occupied by Dinamo Pitești, 1961–62 – 4th, 1962–63 – 4th. 1963–64 Divizia B season was a dramatic one, with a four-way fight for promotion in the first series of the second league. At the end the Students won the promotion, but ended at the same number of points with the 2nd place, Metalul Târgoviște, one point in front of 3rd place, Poiana Câmpina and two points over 4th place, Dinamo Bacău. This 'historical act' was 'signed' by the head coach Nicolae Oțeleanu and following players: Dumitrescu, Vasilescu, Geleriu, Lungan, Deliu, Bărbulescu, Tetea, Ganga, Anton, Lovin, Onea, Vişan, Stanciu, Papuc, C.Stesnescu, A.Stenescu.

As with the previous promotions, the first Divizia A season was a very hard one for the white and blues who saved from relegation in the last rounds, with just one point more than the first relegated team, Minerul Baia Mare. The end of the next season found Știința ranked 8th, in the middle of the standing, and they were already putting the first bases of a team able to issue claims to the title.

In the summer of 1966, the club changed its name again, this time from Știința Craiova to Universitatea Craiova, a name that will remain forever on the lips of all football lovers and team supporters from Romania. Nevertheless, supporters continued to include in their chants and their encouragements the name Știința. In the difficult moments of the games it is known that Universitatea supporters tend to chant: Hei, hei, hai Știința!

As Universitatea followed seasons of contrasting results, in some of them the team delighted the audience in others less, but has remained in the first division, regardless of the situation: 1966–67 – 3rd, 1967–68 – 11th, 1968–69 – 7th, 1969–70 – 4th. There have been 12 years of building and finishing a team that would delight the audience for the next two decades.

"The Champion of a Great Love" (1970–1979)

Craiova started the 70's with a team built around Ion Oblemenco and with players of value such as: Petre Deselnicu, Teodor Țarălungă, Lucian Strâmbeanu or Dumitru Marcu, among others. The start of the decade was not the most convincing, but a decent one, 6th place at the end of the 1970–71 season and 8th place at the end of the 1971–72. The first attempts of the students to shine took place in the 1972–73 season when they finished at the same number of points with Dinamo București but lost the championship on goal difference. This season marked the birth of the nickname: "the Champion of a Great Love", a nickname created by the poet Adrian Păunescu, a big fan of the team from Bănie, he named Dinamo only as the champion of the country, indicating somewhat the suspicious circumstances, in which it was said, that Craiova lost the title.

In the 1973–74 season the title fight was again between Universitatea and Dinamo, but this time Craiova won the title by a point from Dinamo, becoming the first university team to win a national title in Europe. The achievement was all the more impressive as Dinamo was considered to be the pet team of the communist regime, which often influenced the results as well and also after the last season's incidents, Universitatea was increasingly seen as a representative of the people, of the simple man, in the struggle with the communist regime, of pure football and football played on the pitch against the one dominated by arrangements and influences, so the Champion of a Great Love phrase has gained increasing power. The squad that won the first title was coached by Constantin Cernăianu and Constantin Oțet and had the following players included: Oprea, Manta – Niculescu, Bădin, Deselnicu, Velea, Strâmbeanu, Ivan, Niță, Balaci, Berneanu, Țarălungă, Oblemenco, Bălan, Pană, Boc, Ștefănescu, Marcu, Stăncescu, Kiss, Chivu, Negrilă and Constantinescu.

There followed the 1974–75 season which brought a first UEFA European Cup presence against Swedish team Åtvidaberg, lost 3–4 on aggregate, but a decent 3rd place at the end of the championship. 1975–76 season brought a significant fall, the team ending the season only on the 6th place and announcing a generational change. For the last season of the legendary Ion Oblemenco in the white and blue shirt of Universitatea, the expectations were no longer so high, but the team from Craiova amazed the audience again, winning for the first time in its history the Romanian Cup in a final against Steaua București. Also in the Divizia A the team finished on 3rd place.

With the generational exchange made, Universitatea continued to impress in 1978 by defending its Romanian Cup trophy, won a year before against Olimpia Satu Mare and a 6th place in the league. 1978–79 season ended with 4th place and in the UEFA Cup Winners' Cup the club was eliminated in the first round by Fortuna Düsseldorf.

Craiova Maxima (1979–1991)

Craiova Maxima ("The Maximum Craiova") was the second golden generation of Universitatea and a team that recorded, especially in the early and mid 80's, the most notable continental performance in the history of the club. It was a squad composed of many players who grew up close to the first golden team and also this team gave a large part of the 'skeleton' of the Romania national football team such as: Ilie Balaci, Rodion Cămătaru, Costică Ștefănescu, Zoltan Crișan, Ion Geolgău, Aurel Beldeanu, Costică Donose and Silviu Lung, among others.

At the end of the 1979–80 it was crowned the champion of Romania for the second time. Squad: Boldici, Lung – Negrilă, Tilihoi, Ștefănescu, Ungureanu, Balaci, Beldeanu, Crişan, Donose, Cămătaru, Geolgău, Cârțu, Irimescu, Purima and Ciupitu – coaches Valentin Stănescu and Ion Oblemenco. Universitatea had a great UEFA Cup campaign by eliminating Wiener SC and Leeds United until it was beaten in the third round by German side Borussia Mönchengladbach, 1–2 on aggregate.

The team took off and had a fantastic 1980–81 season, managing the historical double, the cup and the championship. As a result of this performance, the students qualified for the 1981–82 European Cup where Craiova Maxima became more and more visible by eliminating Olympiacos and KB, being stopped in the quarter-finals by Bayern Munich, 1–3 in aggregate, an historical performance for the Romanian football at that time.

The long-standing presence in the European Cups affected the team, which finished only on 2nd place, but qualifying in the UEFA Cup and writing history throughout the 1982–83 season, being the first team in the history of Romania that qualified in a European Cup semi-finals. Under the management of Constantin Oțet and Nicolae Ivan the white and blues took out important names in European football, such as Fiorentina (Serie A runners-up), Bordeaux and Kaiserslautern. In the semi-final, Universitatea encountered Benfica, two times European champions and three times European Cup finalists at that time. After two draws, the Portuguese side advanced to the final on aggregate away goals. In the Divizia A, the team finished again on the 2nd place.

The following years have found Universitatea Craiova as a constant presence in the first part of the standing: 1983–84 – 3rd, 1984–85 – 4th, 1985–86 – 3rd, 1986–87 – 5th, 1987–88 – 5th, 1988–89 – 5th and 1988–89 – 3rd. Also the team had a constant presence in the European Cups eliminating remarkable teams such as: Real Betis, Olympiacos, AS Monaco or Galatasaray, but they never qualified far than the third round again. The Students also lost a Romanian Cup final in 1985, 1–2 against Steaua București.

In 1991, CS Universitatea Craiova touched again the peak of the Romanian football, when the event is being held again. Prunea, Mănăilă, Săndoi, Ad. Popescu, Mogoşanu, Ciurea, Olaru, Cristescu, Zamfir, Badea, Pigulea, Agalliu, Craioveanu and Neagoe were the last players that have kissed the championship trophy. Along with coaches Sorin Cârţu and Ștefan Cioacă.

FC U Craiova (1991–2011)

In 1991, Universitatea Craiova conquered its last national title and Romanian Cup, under the management of Sorin Cârțu.

However, in the same year, the CS Universitatea Craiova sports club dissolved its football section and Fotbal Club Universitatea Craiova continued its tradition until the early 2010s (until 1994, the club was still controlled by the Ministry of National Education). In this troubled period of history, FC U won a Romanian Cup in 1993 and reached three finals, in 1994, 1998 and 2000. The results were far from what fans were used to expect from their team. An important cause was the faulty management of the 1990s and early 2000s, also as a result of the fall of communism, which led to the 2005 relegation, when 41 consecutive years of Divizia A were celebrated.

On 20 July 2011, the club was temporarily excluded by the Romanian Football Federation for failing to withdraw their dispute with former coach Victor Pițurcă from a civil court, as per article 57 of the FRF statute which states that the Football Federation solves all the sports lawsuits. However, the article allows disputes regarding employment contracts to be adjudicated in civil court. The exclusion decision was approved by the FRF General Assembly on 14 May 2012. All of the squad players were declared free agents and signed with other clubs.

Refounding and struggles to regain identity (2013–present)

On 20 July 2011, the Romanian Football Federation decided to disaffiliate FC Universitatea Craiova, but the decision was attacked in court. Consequently, in the summer of 2013, local authorities of Craiova, supported by Pavel Badea, and associated with Club Sportiv U Craiova SA, refounded the football section of CS U Craiova. CS U claimed that it owns all of the Universitatea honours, and that the sports club did not offer its records to FC U Craiova, which was considered a new club; this was confirmed in justice in June 2016 and reaffirmed by LPF in November 2017. Therefore, CS Universitatea Craiova is the rightful owner of the brand and records—excepting the 1992–93 Cupa României, claimed but not officially part of CS U's honours.

On 14 August 2013, CS Universitatea Craiova was provisionally affiliated to the Romanian Football Federation, following complications with licensing file. After resolving the issues, the club was introduced in Liga II, the second tier of the Romanian league system. Universitatea made its season debut on 27 August, with a 6–1 success over Pandurii II Târgu Jiu in the fourth round of the Romanian Cup. In the 2013–14 Liga II season, CS Universitatea Craiova and FC U Craiova met in two direct matches, which gave rise to a lot of tension and uncertainty regarding the true identities of the clubs. CS Universitatea Craiova promoted back to Liga I in 2014 after 23 years of absence, while FC U Craiova was excluded again, this time permanently, but later reappeared under the name of FC U Craiova 1948 in 2017.

After the promotion, Universitatea ended the 2014–15 campaign on the 5th place. This result was followed by an 8th place in the 2015–16 season and a 4th place at the end of the 2016–17 season, the latter ensuring return to European competitions. The comeback brought an important opponent in the third qualifying round of the UEFA Europa League, Italian side A.C. Milan, Craiova leaving the competition after 0–3 on aggregate. On 27 May 2018, Universitatea won its first trophy since being refounded after beating second tier club Hermannstadt in the Cupa României final. The game ended 2–0 and was hosted by the Arena Națională in Bucharest. One month later, the Romanian Football Federation approved an application to change the name of the society from "Club Sportiv U Craiova SA" to "U Craiova 1948 Club Sportiv SA". As the winner of Cupa României, Craiova subsequently took part in the 2018 Supercupa României, which they lost 0–1 to CFR Cluj on home ground.

Two years later on 3 August 2020, also in a home ground game against CFR Cluj, Universitatea Craiova came close to winning its first national league since the 1990–91 season. Dan Nistor opened the scoring for Craiova in the eleventh minute, but their title contenders turned the game around and won the final fixture of the season 3–1, thus becoming champions for the third consecutive year.

Grounds

Stadionul Ion Oblemenco (1967)

Ion Oblemenco Stadium was a multi-purpose stadium in Craiova, and was originally named Central Stadium. It was used mostly for football matches and would hold up to 25,252 people before it was demolished. The stadium was opened on 29 October 1967, with the national teams of Romania and Poland drawing after scoring two goals each.

It hosted many memorable matches during the Craiova Maxima era, such as the 1981–82 European Cup quarterfinal against Bayern Munich and the 1982–83 UEFA Cup semi-final against Benfica. Following the death of Universitatea Craiova legend Ion Oblemenco in 1996, the stadium was renamed in his honour. In 2008, the stadium underwent a major renovation, and in 2015 was entirely demolished.

The new Stadionul Ion Oblemenco

The new Ion Oblemenco Stadium, with a capacity of 30,929 seats, was inaugurated on 10 November 2017 with a friendly match between Universitatea Craiova and Czech club Slavia Prague.

Support

Universitatea Craiova has many fans in Craiova and especially in the region of Oltenia, but also in Romania, being the third-most supported team in the country after FCSB and Dinamo București, as shown in a 2016 survey.

Many ultras groups exist, but in 2013 a strong division among the fans occurred due to the uncertainty regarding the true identities of the two clubs which claim the record of Universitatea. Sezione Ultra' 2000 and Utopia from Peluza Nord chose to support CS Universitatea Craiova, while Praetoria and Ultras 2004 from Peluza Sud 97 chose FC U Craiova. Later in 2017, Ultras Craiova 2004 left FC U and decided to remain neutral.

After some time, giving the fact that CS Universitatea Craiova acquired most of the records many new groups were founded in Peluza Nord Craiova: North Lions, Vechiul Spirit Ultras, Nord Oltenia, Gruppo Sibiu, Gruppo Capitala, Ponsiona and UNU MAI UNIT.

In March 2018, FC U Craiova supporters attending a friendly game between Romania and Sweden at the Stadionul Ion Oblemenco booed CS U player Alexandru Mitriță upon being substituted out. They also broke chairs, and as a response CS U fans symbolically used insecticide to "get rid of the stench" left over by Peluza Sud 97 ultras.

Rivalries

Universitatea Craiova holds a long-standing grudge against Dinamo București, which developed at the end of the 1972–73 season. The two finished with an equal number of points in the national championship, but Dinamo was awarded the title due to having a slightly superior goal difference.

Știința also has less intense rivalries with the other three important clubs from the capital, Steaua București, FCSB and Rapid București. Throughout time the club had local competition with sides such as Extensiv Craiova and, from 2013, FC U Craiova, the aforementioned entity which as well claims the Universitatea record. The 2010s also saw the start of a minor rivalry against Pandurii Târgu Jiu, another notable team from Oltenia.

Honours
Note: As of November 2017, LPF attributes all Universitatea Craiova trophies won between 1948 and 1991 to this entity. The ownership of these honours is disputed with FC U Craiova 1948, which acted as the continuation of Universitatea Craiova after the sports club dissolved its football section in 1991. Another court order from 2018 suggested that neither of the current clubs actually hold the original honours.

Domestic

Leagues
Liga I
Winners (4): 1973–74, 1979–80, 1980–81, 1990–91
Runners-up (4): 1972–73, 1981–82, 1982–83, 2019–20
Liga II
Winners (2): 1963–64, 2013–14
Runners-up (1): 1960–61
Liga III
Winners (1): 1957–58

Cups
Cupa României
Winners (7): 1976–77, 1977–78, 1980–81, 1982–83, 1990–91, 2017–18, 2020–21
Runners-up (2): 1974–75, 1984–85
Supercupa României
Winners (1): 2021
Runners-up (1): 2018

Players

First team squad

Out on loan 
{{

Club officials

Board of directors

 Last updated: 16 February 2023
 Source:

Current technical staff 

 Last updated: 2 January 2023
 Source:

Records and statistics

European cups all-time statistics

League history

Notable former players

Romania
  Alexandru Băluță
  Alexandru Cicâldău
  Cristian Bărbuț
  Dan Nistor
  Marius Briceag
  Valentin Mihăilă
  Mihai Bălașa
  Alexandru Mitriță
  Costin Curelea
  Marius Constantin
  Simon Măzărache
  Sebastian Achim
  Andrei Burlacu
  Cristian Bălgrădean
  Andrei Hergheligiu
  Andrei Dumitraș
  Viorel Ferfelea
  Mihai Roman II
  Cristian Ganea
  Ovidiu Bic
  Mihăiță Pleșan
  Dacian Varga
  Florin Gardoș
  Paul Papp

Albania
  Kamer Qaka
Argentina
  Pablo Brandán
Brazil
  Madson
  Gustavo Vagenin
Bulgaria 
  Hristo Zlatinski
  Apostol Popov
  Radoslav Dimitrov
  Valentin Iliev
Cape Verde
  Nuno Rocha
  Kay
Côte d'Ivoire
  Stephane Acka 
Croatia
  Renato Kelić
Germany
  Reagy Ofosu

Ghana
  Isaac Donkor
Italy
  Mirko Pigliacelli
  Fausto Rossi
Jordan
  Tha'er Bawab
Lithuania
  Giedrius Arlauskis
Moldova
  Nicolae Calancea
Portugal
  Tiago Ferreira
Serbia
  Uroš Ćosić
Spain
  Juan Cámara
Switzerland
  Matteo Fedele

Universitatea Craiova players at final tournaments

2015 Africa Cup of Nations
 Cape Verde – Kay
 Cape Verde – Nuno Rocha

Notable former managers

Romania
  Ion Oblemenco
  Constantin Oțet
  Sorin Cârțu
  Mircea Rădulescu
  Victor Pițurcă 
  Emil Săndoi
  Gheorghe Mulțescu
  Laurențiu Reghecampf
Greece
  Marinos Ouzounidis
Italy
  Devis Mangia
  Cristiano Bergodi

Notes

References

External links

Club profile on UEFA's official website
Club profile on LPF's official website

 
Football clubs in Dolj County
1948 establishments in Romania
Sport in Craiova
Organizations based in Craiova
Association football clubs established in 1948
Liga I clubs
Liga II clubs
University and college association football clubs in Romania
CS